Pneumothorax ex vacuo is a rare type of pneumothorax which forms adjacent to an atelectatic lobe. It is seen preferentially with atelectasis of the right upper lobe and is the result of rapid atelectasis producing an abrupt decrease in the intrapleural pressure with subsequent release of nitrogen from pleural capillaries.

Treatment 
Treatment consists of bronchoscopy rather than chest tube drainage. Radiographically, pneumothorax ex vacuo is suggested when an atelectatic lobe or lung, particularly right upper lobe atelectasis, is surrounded by a focal pneumothorax.

Related illness 
"Trapped lung" presents in the same way as pneumothorax ex vacuo and can occur in patients with visceral pleural thickening and following drainage of an effusion.

References 

Pulmonology